Warden Energy Centre is a power station owned by Markham District Energy Incorporated situated at the northwest corner of Warden Avenue and Highway 407 in Markham, Ontario, Canada. The 5.2 MW CHP plant uses natural gas to power 2 Caterpillar G3612 natural gas driven reciprocating
engine generator.

The combined heating power plant, an 8.5MW CHP, first opened in 2000 with a 12 MW heating capacity and 40MW hot water thermal storage. The additional CHP plant opened in 2008 is a small building attached to the former Markham Hydro head office building (now Administration Centre for Markham Fire and Emergency Services).

The Warden plant is one of three power plants supply energy for MDE:

 Bur Oak Energy Centre - 3.25 MW CHP opened in 2014
 Birchmount Energy Centre - 2.6 MW CHP with 10 MW heating capacity opened in 2010 at Birchmount Road and Highway 407

Description
The plant consists of:
  two Caterpillar G3612 natural gas driven reciprocating engines

References

Natural gas-fired power stations in Ontario